Gábor Kucsera (born 27 August 1982 in Budapest) is a Hungarian sprint canoeist who has competed since 2005. He won six medals at the ICF Canoe Sprint World Championships with two golds (K-2 1000 m: 2005, 2006), a silver (K-2 500 m: 2009), and three bronzes (K-2 500 m: 2006, 2007; K-2 1000 m: 2007).

Kucsera also competed at the 2008 Summer Olympics in Beijing, finishing fourth in both the K-2 500 m and K-2 1000 m events.

He is a member of the Honvéd-Domino in Budapest.

In July 2015 he was accused to fail a dopping control,  cocaine found in his blood. He was suspended by the Hungarian Canoe Association.

References

Canoe09.ca profile 

1982 births
Canoeists at the 2008 Summer Olympics
Hungarian male canoeists
Living people
Olympic canoeists of Hungary
ICF Canoe Sprint World Championships medalists in kayak
Doping cases in canoeing
Hungarian sportspeople in doping cases
Canoeists from Budapest
21st-century Hungarian people